(born June 30, 1972) is a Japanese softball player who played in the 2000 Summer Olympics mostly as a Left field, but on one occasion played as a Pinch Runner in the game against New Zealand. She won the silver medal for Japan.

References

Japanese softball players
Living people
Softball players at the 2000 Summer Olympics
Olympic softball players of Japan
Olympic silver medalists for Japan
1972 births
Olympic medalists in softball
Asian Games medalists in softball
Softball players at the 1998 Asian Games
Medalists at the 1998 Asian Games
Asian Games silver medalists for Japan
Medalists at the 2000 Summer Olympics